A warehouse is a storage facility.

Warehouse or The Warehouse may also refer to:

Buildings and places

Canada
 The Warehouse (Toronto), a defunct nightclub in Toronto, Ontario
 The Warehouse Studio, a recording facility and photography studio in Vancouver, British Columbia

France 
 Warehouse (Nantes), a cultural club based in Nantes, specialised in electronic music.

United Kingdom
 Warehouse, Langport, a structure in Langport, Somerset
 The Warehouse (Preston, Lancashire), a nightclub and music venue

United States
 Warehouse (nightclub), a defunct club, credited as the origin of the term "house music", in Chicago, Illinois
 Warehouse (Raleigh), a business district in Raleigh, North Carolina
 The Warehouse (New Orleans), a defunct rock-music venue in New Orleans, Louisiana
 The Warehouse (Syracuse), a building in Syracuse, New York

Companies
 Warehouse (clothing), a British women's clothing retail chain
 The Warehouse Group, a New Zealand retailer

Music
 "Warehouse" (song), a 1994 song by Dave Matthews Band
 Warehouse (Dave Matthews Band), the official fan association for Dave Matthews Band
 Warehouse: Songs and Stories, a 1987 album by Hüsker Dü

See also 
 List of warehouse districts
 Warehouse Theatre (disambiguation)
 Wherehouse, a warehouse formerly used as a rehearsal space and studio by the band Aerosmith, in Waltham, Massachusetts, US
 Wherehouse Entertainment, a defunct American music retailer